Naravaripalle is a village in Tirupati. It is located in Chandragiri mandal in  Tirupati district of the Indian state of Andhra Pradesh.  N. Chandrababu Naidu   born and brought up in this village

References 

 Tirupati district